The Château de la Canière is a château in Thuret, Puy-de-Dôme, France. It was built in 1889 on the site of a previous château by the Bérard de Chazelles family to house the collections of their relative the chemist Antoine Lavoisier.

References

External links
Official website

Châteaux in Puy-de-Dôme
Houses completed in the 19th century
19th-century architecture in France